Kido Taylor-Hart (born 30 September 2002) is a professional footballer who plays as a forward for Derby County on loan from Arsenal.

Club career
Taylor-Hart started his career with Focus Football, while also training at a local project run by Premier League club Arsenal. At the age of seven, while playing for Focus Football, he was spotted by Arsenal scout Brian Stapleton, and invited to sign with The Gunners.

Having developed through the youth ranks at Arsenal, and establishing himself as one of the club's top prospects, Taylor-Hart was invited to train with the first team before he had signed a professional deal. He would go on to sign professional terms in August 2021.

On 31 January 2023, he joined Derby County's under-21 squad on loan until the end of the season.

International career
Taylor-Hart is eligible to represent England and Jamaica at international level. He has represented England at under-17 level.

Career statistics
.

References

2002 births
Living people
English sportspeople of Jamaican descent
English footballers
England youth international footballers
Association football forwards
Arsenal F.C. players
Derby County F.C. players
Black British sportspeople